Butterfinger is a candy bar manufactured by the Ferrero SpA, a subsidiary of Ferrero. It consists of a layered crisp peanut butter core covered in a chocolatey coating. Invented by Otto Schnering of the Curtiss Candy Company in 1923, the name of the candy was chosen by a popularity contest. In its early years, it was promoted by Shirley Temple in the 1934 film Baby Take a Bow. Butterfinger was advertised by characters from an animated sketch series on Fox's The Tracey Ullman Show called The Simpsons beginning in 1988. The animated series became a smash hit for Fox, and its characters continued to represent the candy bar in commercial advertisements until 2001.

History
Butterfingers were invented by Otto Schnering in 1923. Schnering had founded the Curtiss Candy Company near Chicago, Illinois, in 1922. The company held a public contest to choose the name of this candy. In an early marketing campaign, the company dropped Butterfinger and Baby Ruth candy bars from airplanes in cities across the United States as a publicity stunt that helped increase its popularity.

The candy bar was also promoted in Baby Take a Bow, a 1934 film featuring Shirley Temple.

In 1964, Standard Brands, Inc. purchased the Curtiss Candy Company. It then merged with Nabisco in 1981. RJR Nabisco was formed in 1985 by the merger of Nabisco Brands and R.J. Reynolds Tobacco Company. 

In December 1988, RJR Nabisco was purchased by Kohlberg Kravis Roberts & Co. in what was, at the time, the largest leveraged buyout in history. In February 1990, Nestlé, a Swiss multinational food and beverage company, bought Baby Ruth and Butterfinger from RJR Nabisco. When measured by revenues, Nestlé is by far the largest food company in the world.

Butterfinger was withdrawn from the market in Germany in 1999, because of consumer rejection when it was one of the first products to be identified as containing genetically modified ingredients (GMOs) from corn. Butterfinger sales ended after a successful campaign by Greenpeace pushed Nestlé to remove the product from German supermarkets.

With sales in 2010 of $598 million, Butterfinger had become increasingly popular and was typically ranked as the eleventh most popular candy bar sold in the $17.68 billion United States chocolate confectionery market between 2007 and 2010.

In January 2018, Nestlé announced plans to sell over twenty of its US confectionery brands (including Butterfinger) to Italian chocolatier Ferrero SpA, for $2.8 billion. The deal was finalized in March 2018, and the newly acquired brands were folded into the operations of the Ferrara Candy Company.

Recipe change
Ferrero reformulated the Butterfinger in January 2019, with labels displaying "Improved Recipe". "Better" Butterfinger, as it is identified in advertising, uses larger runner peanuts in the bar's core that are roasted at the manufacturing plant. The new bar also uses a higher percentage of cocoa and milk in the chocolately coating and cuts ingredients such as the preservative TBHQ and hydrogenated oils. 

The packaging itself has also been upgraded to avoid spoilage.

Representatives of the brand claimed that sales had "improved with the new recipe, specifically after posting a double-digit sales decline prior to the brand revamp." Some social media users have criticized the new recipe.

Advertising campaigns
Beginning in 1988, Butterfinger was advertised with The Simpsons, including the advertisement "The Butterfinger Group", which notably featured the debut of Simpsons character Milhouse Van Houten. The Simpsons was immediately popular and boosted the candy's popularity. In 1992, the Simpsons began to appear in Butterfinger BB's commercials. The Simpsons-Butterfinger marketing was phased out by 2001 but brought back in 2010.

Butterfinger campaigns include counting down the end of the world or BARmageddon, with evidence such as the first-ever, QR shaped crop circle in Kansas, a Butterfinger comedy-horror movie called “Butterfinger the 13th,” the first interactive digital graphic novel by a candy brand starring the Butterfinger Defense League, and several attention-grabbing April Fool's Day pranks, including the renaming of the candy bar to “The Finger.”

On April 1, 2008, Nestlé launched an April Fool's Day prank in which they claimed that they had changed the name of the candy bar to "The Finger", citing consumer research that indicated that the original brand was "clumsy" and "awkward". The prank included a fake website promoting the change that featured a video press release. When the joke was revealed, the website redirected visitors to the fictitious "Butterfinger Comedy Network".

In 2009, a new advertisement for Butterfinger was produced that appeared to be a homage to the earlier The Simpsons commercials. In February 2010, Butterfinger revived its "Nobody better lay a finger..." slogan as "Nobody's gonna lay a finger on my Butterfinger." A comedy horror film entitled Butterfinger The 13th was made to promote the product in October 2011.

In April 2013, an official announcement via the Twitter account of The Simpsons stated that the "Nobody better lay a finger on my Butterfinger" advertising campaign featuring Bart Simpson would be returning. In the opening sequence of "Treehouse of Horror XXVIII" (2017), the family appeared as candy in a bowl. Bart, a Butterfinger bar, tells his mother, Marge, a "Marge Bar", he is scared, and she comforts him by stating he's always the last to be taken.

Sponsorships

Butterfinger sponsored pro Freestyle Motocross rider Nate Adams as well as pro BMX rider Ryan Nyquist in 2003.

Variations

Bites: In 2009, Butterfinger introduced Mini Bites, a product with small, bite-sized pieces of Butterfinger.
Snackerz: Butterfinger Snackerz is another bite-sized, smooth-centered version of the candy bar.
BB's: Starting in 1992, another form of Butterfinger bars was available called BB's. Similar to Whoppers and Maltesers, they were roughly the size of marbles and sold in bags. They also were advertised by the Simpsons. Discontinued 2006, relaunched 2009 as Butterfinger Bites. 
Buzz: During the height of the energy drink craze in 2009, a two piece ‘king size’ version of the candy bar containing 80 milligrams of caffeine was released with limited distribution. The wrapper bears this warning: "Contains 80 mg per package (40 mg per piece), as much as in the leading energy drink. Not recommended for pregnant women, children or persons sensitive to caffeine. They were quickly discontinued."
Ice Cream Bar: A product with an ice cream filling, the Butterfinger Ice Cream Bar, was introduced and continues to be sold in individual bags to this day. Another product similar to that of Butterfinger Ice Cream Bars, but shaped in a nugget form, also was developed and is now discontinued.
Crisp: Nestlé also produces Butterfinger Crisp bars, which are a form of chocolate covered wafer cookie, with a Butterfinger flavored cream. This is part of a line of Nestlé products under a "crisp" name, including Nestlé Crunch Crisp and Baby Ruth Crisp.
Cocoa Mix: Nestlé released a hot cocoa mix with the flavor of the Butterfinger bar. The packaging advertises the cocoa as having a chocolate and peanut butter taste.
Cups: In 2014, a product similar to Reese's Peanut Butter Cups was introduced by Nestlé, the Butterfinger Peanut Butter Cup, which unlike Reese's Cups, has both crunchy and creamy peanut butter and covers the mix with milk chocolate. It was the first new Butterfinger product introduced in more than five years. Nestlé spent two years developing the product. However, they were discontinued in 2020.
Naked: The Naked Butterfinger is a version of the standard size candy bar that will only have a coating of chocolate on the bottom to hold it together.
Dark: Made with Dark Chocolate. They were discontinued in 2018 when the bars were sold to Ferrero SpA.

Use by other manufacturers
A part of Edy's Fun Flavors line (branded as Dreyer's west of the Rocky Mountains and outside the United States). The product is vanilla ice cream with a peanut butter swirl and bits of the Butterfinger candy bar in it.

Grocery store Kroger has a flavor in their "Jammed" line called Peanut Butter Candy Crunch that is a peanut-flavored frozen dairy dessert with Butterfinger chunks and a peanut butter swirl whose flavor resembles that of the Butterfinger candy bar.

See also
 5th Avenue (candy)
 Clark Bar
 List of chocolate bar brands
 Baby Ruth

References

External links

 Butterfinger website

Chocolate bars
Ice cream brands
Ferrero SpA brands
Peanut butter confectionery
Products introduced in 1923
Brand name confectionery